The Kokoon Arts Club, sometimes spelled Kokoon Arts Klub, was a Bohemian artists group founded in 1911 by Carl Moellman, William Sommer and Elmer Brubeck to promote Modernism in Cleveland, Ohio. Moellman had been a member of New York City's Kit Kat Club, which served as inspiration for Kokoon. From 1913 to 1946 Kokoon's annual Bal-Masque balls scandalized Cleveland with risqué activities, provocative art, and nudity, and was sometimes humorously referred to as the "Cocaine Club". A fierce rivalry stood between Kokoon and the more conservative Cleveland Society of Artists.

See also
Cleveland School
Cleveland Artists Foundation

References

External links
 Cleveland Artists Foundation
 Kokoon Arts Club and Philip Kaplan, Papers, circa 1918-1986 (bulk 1923-1938)
 The Kokoon Arts Club: Cleveland Revels!
 Kokoon Arts Gallery

Further reading 

American art
American artist groups and collectives
Cleveland School (arts community)
Arts organizations based in Ohio
Organizations based in Cleveland
Arts organizations established in 1911
1911 establishments in Ohio